This is a list of seasons played by Moseley Rugby Football Club in English rugby from 1972, the year of the first formalised English rugby union club competition, to the most recent completed season.

Seasons

Key

P = Played
W = Games won
D = Games drawn
L = Games lost
F = Points for
A = Points against
Pts = Final League points
Pos = Final League position

Nat Div 1 = National Division 1
Nat Div 2 = National Division 2
Prem 2 = Premiership 2
Cham = Championship
Divisions in bold indicate a change in division.

Grp = Group Stage
R1 = Round 1
R2 = Round 2
R3 = Round 3
R4 = Round 4
R5 = Round 5
QF = Quarter-finals 
SF = Semi-finals
R/U = Runners-up
W = Winners

Footnotes

References

Sport in Birmingham, West Midlands
Sport in the West Midlands (county)